Gustavo Monje (born 8 June 1971) is an Argentine stage actor and director. He has also had minor roles in films like Burnt Money (2000) and Arregui, la noticia del día (2001),  but his work is mainly in stage. In 2005 he appeared in Stephanie.

References

External links
 

Argentine male stage actors
1971 births
Living people
Argentine theatre directors
Place of birth missing (living people)